Eulepethidae is a family of polychaetes belonging to the order Phyllodocida.

Genera:
 Eulepethus Chamberlin, 1919
 Grubeulepis Pettibone, 1969
 Lamelleulepethus Pettibone, 1986
 Lammeleulepethus Pettibone, 1986
 Mexieulepis Rioja, 1962
 Pareulepis Darboux, 1900
 Proeulepethus Pettibone, 1986

References

Polychaetes